Emilia Matteoli (born 12 October 1999) is an Italian professional racing cyclist, who most recently rode for UCI Women's Continental Team .

References

External links

1999 births
Living people
Italian female cyclists
Place of birth missing (living people)